The Malaysia–New Zealand Free Trade Agreement was signed on 26 October 2009 in Kuala Lumpur.

Malaysia is New Zealand's eighth-largest export destination, reaching almost 8 billion dollars' worth of exports in 2008.
It was ratified by the Parliament of New Zealand on 24 June 2010 and entered into force on 1 August 2010.

See also
 New Zealand free trade agreements
 Free trade agreement
 Malaysia–New Zealand relations

References

Free trade agreements of Malaysia
Free trade agreements of New Zealand
Treaties concluded in 2009
Treaties of Malaysia
Treaties entered into force in 2010
Malaysia–New Zealand relations